E3 ubiquitin-protein ligase RNF5 is an enzyme that in humans is encoded by the RNF5 gene.

Function 

The protein encoded by this gene contains a RING finger, which is a motif known to be involved in protein-protein interactions. This protein is a membrane-bound ubiquitin ligase. It can regulate cell motility by targeting paxillin ubiquitination and altering the distribution and localization of paxillin in cytoplasm and cell focal adhesions.

References

Further reading

External links 
 

RING finger proteins